An imaging spectrometer is an instrument used in hyperspectral imaging and imaging spectroscopy to acquire a spectrally-resolved image of an object or scene, often referred to as a datacube due to the three-dimensional representation of the data. Two axes of the image corresponds to vertical and horizontal distance and the third to wavelength. The principle of operation is the same as that of the simple spectrometer, but special care is taken to avoid optical aberrations for better image quality.

Example imaging spectrometer types include: filtered camera, whiskbroom scanner, pushbroom scanner, integral field spectrograph (or related dimensional reformatting techniques), wedge imaging spectrometer, Fourier transform imaging spectrometer, computed tomography imaging spectrometer (CTIS), image replicating imaging spectrometer (IRIS), coded aperture snapshot spectral imager (CASSI), and image mapping spectrometer (IMS).

Principle 
Imaging spectrometers are used specifically for the purpose of measuring the spectral content of light and electromagnetic light. The spectral data gathered is used to give the operator insight into the sources of radiation. Prism spectrometers use a classical method of dispersing radiation by means of a prism as a refracting element.

The imaging spectrometer works by imaging a radiation source onto what is called a "slit" by means of a source imager. A collimator collimates the beam that is dispersed by a refracting prism and re-imaged onto a detection system by a re-imager. Special care is taken to produce the best possible image of the source onto the slit. The purpose of the collimator and re-imaging optics are to take the best possible image of the slit. An area-array of elements fills the detection system at this stage. The source image is reimaged, every point, as a line spectrum on what is called a detector-array column. The detector array signals supply data pertaining to spectral content, in particular, spatially resolved source points inside source area. These source points are imaged onto the slit and then re-imaged onto the detector array. Simultaneously, the system provides spectral information about the source area and its line of spatially resolved points. The line is then scanned in order to build a database of information about the spectral content.

Applications

Planetary observations
The practical application of imaging spectrometers is they are used to observe the planet Earth from orbiting satellites. The spectrometer functions by recording all points of color on a picture, thus, the spectrometer is focused on specific parts of the Earth’s surface to record data. The advantages of spectral content data include vegetation identification, physical condition analysis, mineral identification for the purpose of potential mining, and the assessment of polluted waters in oceans, coastal zones and inland waterways.

Prism spectrometers are ideal for Earth observation because they measure wide spectral ranges competently. Spectrometers can be set to cover a range from 400 nm to 2,500 nm, which interests scientists who are able to observe Earth by means of aircraft and satellite. The spectral resolution of the prism spectrometer is not desirable for most scientific applications; thus, its purpose is specific to recording spectral content of areas with greater spatial variations.

Venus express, orbiting Venus, had a number of imaging spectrometers covering NIR-vis-UV.

Disadvantages 
The lenses of the prism spectrometer are used for both collimation and re-imaging; however, the imaging spectrometer is limited in its performance by the image quality provided by the collimators and re-imagers. The resolution of the slit image at each wavelength limits spatial resolution; likewise, the resolution of optics across the slit image at each wavelength limits spectral resolution. Moreover, distortion of the slit image at each wavelength can complicate the interpretation of the spectral data.

The refracting lenses used in the imaging spectrometer limit performance by the axial chromatic aberrations of the lens. These chromatic aberrations are bad because they create differences in focus, which prevent good resolution; however, if the range is restricted it is possible to achieve good resolution. Furthermore, chromatic aberrations can be corrected by using two or more refracting materials over the full visible range. It is harder to correct chromatic aberrations over wider spectral ranges without further optical complexity.

Systems 
Spectrometers intended for very wide spectral ranges are best if made with all-mirror systems. These particular systems have no chromatic aberrations, and that is why they are preferable. On the other hand, spectrometers with single point or linear array detection systems require simpler mirror systems. Spectrometers using area-array detectors need more complex mirror systems to provide good resolution. It is conceivable that a collimator could be made that would prevent all aberrations; however, this design is expensive because it requires the use of aspherical mirrors.

Smaller two-mirror systems can correct aberrations, but they are not suited for imaging  spectrometers. Three mirror systems are compact and correct aberrations as well, but they require at least two asperical components. Systems with more than four mirrors tend to be large and a lot more complex. Catadioptric systems are used in Imagine Spectrometers and are compact, too; however, the collimator or imager will be made up of two curved mirrors and three refracting elements, and thus, the system is very complex.

Optical complexity is unfavorable, however, because effects scatter all optical surfaces and stray reflections. Scattered radiation can interfere with the detector by entering into it and causing errors in recorded spectra. Stray radiation is referred to as stray light. By limiting the total number of surfaces that can contribute to scatter, it limits the introduction of stray light into the equation.

Imaging spectrometers are meant to produce well resolved images. In order for this to occur, imaging spectrometers need to be made with few optical surfaces and have no aspherical optical surfaces.

Examples
Ralph (New Horizons), Visible and ultraviolet imaging spectrometer on New Horizons
Jovian Infrared Auroral Mapper, infrared imaging spectrometer on Juno Jupiter orbiter
Mapping Imaging Spectrometer for Europa (planned for developmental Europa Clipper spacecraft
Compact Reconnaissance Imaging Spectrometer for Mars (CRISM), imaging spectrometer in Mars orbit aboard Mars Reconnaissance Orbiter

See also
Landsat

References

External links
 List of imaging spectrometer instruments

Image sensors
Spectrometers